Center Theater or Center Theatre may refer to:

Center Theatre (New York City), a former theater
Center Theatre (Woodbourne, New York)
Center Theater (Norfolk, Virginia), now the Harrison Opera House 
Center Theater (Little Rock, Arkansas), listed on the National Register of Historic Places in Pulaski County, Arkansas
Center Theater (Hartsville, South Carolina), listed on the National Register of Historic Places in Darlington County, South Carolina
Center Theatre (Dover-Foxcroft), a performing arts center in Dover-Foxcroft, Maine

See also
Center Theatre Group, Los Angeles theatre organization